Pseudoalteromonas arctica is a marine bacterium collected from Spitzbergen in the Arctic.

References

External links

Type strain of Pseudoalteromonas arctica at BacDive -  the Bacterial Diversity Metadatabase

Alteromonadales
Bacteria described in 2008